The 2007 Rivers State gubernatorial election was the 6th gubernatorial election of Rivers State. Held on April 14, 2007, the People's Democratic Party nominee Celestine Omehia won the election, defeating Ashley Emenike of the Labour Party.

Results 
Celestine Omehia from the People's Democratic Party won the election, defeating Ashley Emenike from the Labour Party. Registered voters was 2,583,317.

References 

Rivers State gubernatorial elections
Rivers gubernatorial
April 2007 events in Nigeria